A Walk Among the Tombstones is a 2014 American neo-noir action thriller film directed and written by Scott Frank, and based on the 1992 novel of the same name by Lawrence Block. It stars Liam Neeson, Dan Stevens, David Harbour, and Boyd Holbrook. The film was released on September 19, 2014. The film received mixed reviews from critics and grossed $62 million worldwide.

Plot
Eight years previously, Detective Matthew "Matt" Scudder, in a car with his partner, is urged to get help and is told he is not a reliable backup. Scudder then enters a bar and gets coffee with shots. Two armed men come in and kill the bartender. Scudder shoots one, pursues and kills the second assailant, and the getaway driver.

In New York of 1999, a drug addict named Peter Kristo approaches a retired Scudder, asking him to help his brother Kenny, a drug trafficker. Kenny tells Scudder that his wife was kidnapped and her kidnappers demanded a ransom. After he delivered the ransom as instructed, the kidnappers directed him to a car containing her dismembered body. Kenny asks Scudder to help him find his wife’s killers. Scudder ultimately agrees to help him.

Scudder researches similar killings at a public library. He reads about victims Marie Gotteskind and Leila Andresen. He meets TJ, a homeless streetwise youth. TJ helps with the research.

Based on an article, Scudder goes to a cemetery and speaks with a groundskeeper, Jonas Loogan, upset that Scudder reminds him of finding trash bags with body parts of the dismembered Leila in the cemetery pond.

Scudder talks to Leila's fiancé, Reuben, who saw two men drag her into a van driven by a third. Across the street, Scudder sees Loogan exiting an apartment building. He goes up into the rooftop and finds a shed, where Loogan is living. He sees polaroid photos of Reuben and Leila having sex. Loogan arrives and admits that he helped kidnap Leila. He had conspired to take Leila away from Reuben, who is a drug dealer, and help her stop using drugs. Instead, the other two tortured and killed her. He tells Scudder that he should be scared of the other two men because “they’re not human.” He feeds his pigeons, gives Scudder one name, "Ray," and then he jumps off the roof to his death.

The two kidnappers, Ray and Albert, surveil the home of Yuri Landau, another drug trafficker. After realizing Landau's wife is bedridden, they prepare to leave for a new target. However, they see his 14-year-old daughter, Lucia, and Ray decides to kidnap her.

Scudder eventually learns that the victim Marie Gotteskind was a DEA agent and  determines that whoever murdered her also has her files, which they have been using to target drug dealers and traffickers. Meanwhile, Scudder grows closer to TJ, encouraging the boy to study and avoid a life of crime. He finds him in a hospital one day after a street gang beat down and learns that TJ has sickle cell anemia. Scudder gives him a phone so that TJ can reach him if he needs anything. During a conversation with TJ, Scudder explains why he retired. During the shootout in 1991, he was intoxicated. One of his stray bullets "took a bad hop" and hit a 7-year-old girl in the eye, instantly killing her. Even though he received a commendation, he quit his job as a cop and he gave up alcohol.

Kenny brings Scudder to Yuri Landau's home, where the kidnappers call and arrange to exchange ransom for Lucia at a cemetery. They demand $1 million, and in exchange, Scudder demand that they bring Lucia alive and well. Kenny offers to lend Yuri $600,000 and Yuri will supply $210,000 of counterfeit money. Scudder, Kenny, Landau, Peter, and TJ drive to the cemetery. Scudder orders TJ to stay in the car. After a stand off, Lucia, alive but with two fingers cut down to the bone, is returned to her father. Albert inspects the money and discovers some were counterfeit. A shootout ensues. Peter is killed, and Scudder wounds Ray. Albert and Ray escape in their van, with TJ hiding in the back.

After Albert and Ray arrive at their place, TJ sneaks out of the van. He tells Scudder their address. Albert betrays the wounded Ray by strangling him to death with a metal wire while in the basement. Scudder and Kenny find TJ outside the house and they all silently enter the house finding Albert calmly eating his dinner. Albert surrenders and Scudder cuffs him. Kenny wants to kill him but Scudder talks him down, seeing how TJ is in the room and is watching everything. Scudder reminds Kenny that there is enough evidence to put Albert behind bars for the rest of his life. Kenny reluctantly agrees. Scudder leaves Kenny alone with Albert while he puts TJ in a taxi to his apartment. Kenny knocks Albert unconscious with a bottle. He goes into the basement where he finds Ray’s body and tools used for dismembering bodies. While Kenny is downstairs, Albert wakes up.

Scudder goes back inside the house and finds Albert gone. He goes down the basement and sees Kenny's dead body on the stairs (implying that Albert killed Kenny). Albert suddenly tries to strangle him from behind with a metal wire. After a table-turning fight, Scudder overpowers and tasers Albert. He eventually kills him with a gunshot to the head. A while later, police arrive at the crime scene with Scudder observing from afar.

Scudder returns home to find TJ sleeping on the couch and spots a drawing that TJ made of himself as a superhero, with a sickle on his costume representing his sickle cell anemia.

Cast

 Liam Neeson as Matthew Scudder
 Dan Stevens as Kenny Kristo
 Boyd Holbrook as Peter Kristo
 Ólafur Darri Ólafsson as Jonas Loogan
 Brian "Astro" Bradley as TJ
 Mark Consuelos as Reuben Quintana
 David Harbour as Ray
 Adam David Thompson as Albert
 Sebastian Roché as Yuri Landau
 Laura Birn as Leila Andresen
 Razane Jammal as Carrie Kristo
 Leon Addison Brown as Stover
 Danielle Rose Russell as Lucia
 Marielle Heller as Marie Gotteskind

Development
A film adaptation of Block’s novel had been in development for several years with a script from Scott Frank. The film is largely faithful to the core story of the novel, while cutting several subplots and supporting characters. In 2002, Harrison Ford was attached to star and D. J. Caruso to direct. In May 2012, Liam Neeson had reportedly signed on to play Matthew Scudder in the film, with Frank himself directing, and production slated to begin February 2013.

Filming began on March 3, 2013 in New York City. Producers invited author Block to the set to watch filming. On the casting of Neeson, Block said, "Readers often ask who'd be my ideal Matt Scudder, and I usually change the subject. But now it's safe to tell you that, ever since I saw him in Michael Collins, Neeson has been up at the top of my personal Scudder wish list. I couldn't be happier about either the star or the writer/director, both of them genuine artists and brilliant professionals. My book's in good hands."

The film was completed on October 8, 2013 and classified by the MPAA as rated R for "strong violence, disturbing images, language, and brief nudity". On October 18, 2013, Block tweeted that he had seen the film and revealed producers were aiming for a September 2014 release. On January 30, 2014, it was announced the film would be released on September 19, 2014.

Reception

Box office 
A Walk Among the Tombstones grossed $26 million in the United States and Canada, and $36.1 million  in other territories, for a worldwide total gross of $62.1 million, against its $28 million budget.

The film earned $428,000 from Thursday night from 1,918 theaters, and $4.7 million from 2,712 theaters on its opening day. It debuted at number two at the box office on its opening weekend earning $13.1 million behind The Maze Runner ($32.5 million).

Critical response 
On review aggregator Rotten Tomatoes, the film holds an approval rating of 68% based on 165 reviews, with an average rating of 6.20/10. The site's critical consensus reads, "A Walk Among the Tombstones doesn't entirely transcend its genre clichés, but it does offer Liam Neeson one of his more compelling roles in recent memory, and that's often enough." On Metacritic, the film has a weighted average score of 57 out of 100, based on 36 critics, indicating "mixed or average reviews". Audiences polled by CinemaScore gave the film an average grade of "B−" on an A+ to F scale.

Richard Roeper gave the film a B+ rating, calling the film "a stylish and smart thriller". Manohla Dargis in The New York Times called it "one of those rare cinematic offerings: intelligent pulp" but also noted that the film "can be tough to watch, particularly its fleeting images of tortured women". In Variety, Andrew Barker found it a well-made thriller "with a good deal of panache and style".

References

External links

 
 

2010s mystery thriller films
2014 films
2014 action thriller films
2014 crime thriller films

American action thriller films
American crime thriller films
American mystery thriller films
American neo-noir films
Cross Creek Pictures films
2010s English-language films
Films directed by Scott Frank
Films produced by Brian Oliver
Films produced by Danny DeVito
Films set in 1991
Films set in 1999
Films based on American novels
Films based on crime novels
Films set in New York City
Films about murder
Films about kidnapping
Films shot in New York City
Films with screenplays by Scott Frank
Universal Pictures films
Buena Vista International films
2010s American films